Kovrovsky District is an administrative and municipal district (raion), one of the sixteen in Vladimir Oblast, Russia. It is located in the north of the oblast. Its administrative center is the city of Kovrov (which is not administratively a part of the district). Population:   31,148 (2002 Census);

Administrative and municipal status
Within the framework of administrative divisions, Kovrovsky District is one of the sixteen in the oblast. The city of Kovrov serves as its administrative center, despite being incorporated separately as an administrative unit with the status equal to that of the districts.

As a municipal division, the district is incorporated as Kovrovsky Municipal District. The City of Kovrov is incorporated separately from the district as Kovrov Urban Okrug.

References

Notes

Sources

Districts of Vladimir Oblast